The Volvo LV66-70 was a truck produced by Swedish automaker Volvo between 1931 and 1936.

History
Volvo introduced its first heavy truck in 1931. Unlike its smaller sibling, who used some elements from Volvo’s passenger cars, the LV66-series components were built exclusively for truck use.  These included a new overhead valve engine, a heavy duty four-speed gear box, steel rims and four-wheel hydraulic brakes.

The truck was built in two weight classes: the smaller LV68 and LV69 with a payload of 3.25 tonnes and the heavier LV66 and LV67 with a payload of 3.5 tonnes. From 1933 the LV66 and LV67 could be delivered with a trailing axle which increased the payload to 5.25 tonnes. The long wheelbase LV70 was primarily equipped with bus bodies.

From 1933 the LV66-series were sold with a Hesselman engine as an alternative.

Engines

References

External links 
 Volvo Trucks Global - history
 Swedish brass cars - picture gallery
 Volvo Trucks Databank 

LV66
Vehicles introduced in 1931